Edward Bennett was an American physicist, known from his early involvements in wireless transmission.

He obtained a Ph.D. in electrical engineering at the University of Pittsburgh (then known as the Western University of Pennsylvania) in 1897. The work was on spark-gap transmitters, jointly with William Bradshaw and supervised by Reginald Fessenden. Working at the University of Wisconsin–Madison, he achieved fame in the history of broadcasting from his work with Dr. Earle M. Terry that led to the first transmissions of the WHA (AM) radio station (1914). He later headed the electrical engineering department.

Books
Introductory electrodynamics for engineers (McGraw-Hill, 1926).  With Harold Marion Crothers.

References

Year of birth missing
Year of death missing
American physicists
American electrical engineers
University of Pittsburgh alumni
University of Wisconsin–Madison faculty
Swanson School of Engineering alumni
Fellows of the American Physical Society